Walkerville is an unincorporated community in Addison Township, Shelby County, in the U.S. state of Indiana.

It is located within the city limits of Shelbyville.

Geography

References

Unincorporated communities in Shelby County, Indiana
Unincorporated communities in Indiana
Indianapolis metropolitan area